Conducting polymer metal nanocomposites are.

In past years, polymers were known so far as a class of heat sensitive, flexible, electrically insulting amorphous materials. But new dimensions to present era is given by the discovery of π-conjugated conducting polymers commonly such as polyacetylene (PA). Nowadays various conducting polymers such as polyaniline (PANI), polypyrrole (PPy), polyindole, and polythiophenes (see conductive polymer) are most studied and various methods are reported such as hard template methods, soft template methods are used for the synthesis of various nanostructures.

The basic conduction mechanism in conducting polymers is due to Polarons, Bipolarons and solitons. Conducting polymers are used in various applications such as chemical sensors and biosensors, transistors and switches, data storage devices, photovoltaic cells, and actuators. But the conducting polymers metal nanocomposites allow for more efficient applications than their bulk counterparts. Nowadays various methods such as one-pot synthesis, in situ synthesis, sonochemical synthesis etc. were used and different type of nanostructures such as nanofibers, spherical, one-dimensional nanocomposites and they are used in potential applications such as sensoric and electrochromic devices.

References

External links
 
 
 

Nanomaterials